Donnycarney is a Northside suburb in the city of Dublin, Ireland, in the jurisdiction of Dublin City Council. Dublin GAA's home stadium, Parnell Park, is located here.

Location
Donnycarney is bordered by Beaumont, Artane, Killester and Marino, and lies in the postal districts of Dublin 3, 5 and 9. Donnycarney is served by Dublin Bus routes 14, 15, 27, 27a, 27b, 42 and 43, which all stop at the centre of Donnycarney - the Donnycarney Church bus stops. Go-Ahead Ireland Route 104 from DCU to Clontarf also serves Collins Avenue East. Killester Dart Station is also nearby, at the beginning of Collins Avenue. (TFI) route N4 serves a night-link service from Blanchardstown to Point Village. This stops across from Donnycarney Church while heading through Collins Avenue.

An underground river, the Wad, crosses Donnycarney, while another, the Naniken, crosses the Malahide Road at the edge of Donnycarney towards Coolock.

History 
The lands of Donnycarney were historically owned by the Priory of All Hallows, and after the dissolution of the monasteries, Henry VIII gave the lands to the city of Dublin; at that time, they encompassed the area now known as Marino. The Dublin Corporation allowed the incumbent tenant, Christopher Hetherington, to continue his lease, on the proviso he supply "good and sufficient brawn" to the Mayor of Dublin each Christmas, and maintain the land. After the English Civil War, the Hetherington family lost their lands and their house, which was probably located somewhere in the Marino area. Michael Jones, the governor of Dublin, was given the lands at a nominal rent and was succeeded in this by his sister, Mrs Elliott. William Basil, Attorney-General for Ireland, leased the lands during the Cromwellian period and retained the lands after the Restoration.

John Perceval, 1st Earl of Egmont, succeeded the Basil family in holding the lands, and when he lived there his friend, George Berkeley, would visit him. Berkeley described the walk from Trinity College as lonely but said that Donnycarney was beautiful. The lands were then leased by a number of gentlemen in quick succession, until Thomas Adderley took possession. He built Marino House for his stepson, James Caulfeild, 1st Earl of Charlemont in the southeastern end of Donnycarney which is now called Marino. Caulfield went on to build the Casino at Marino. The lands reverted to the Dublin Corporation after the Caulfields left Marino House, allowing for the construction of the Marino housing scheme, and further Corporation housing schemes in modern-day Donnycarney.

Amenities

Local amenities include restaurants, the Donnycarney/Beaumont Credit Union, a church, a community youth project in the newly built large community centre (Le Chéile), a  park (Maypark) that has a playground, an all-weather pitch and GAA/soccer pitches, chip shops, Chinese takeaways, newsagents and pubs. There are small strips of shops along Collins Avenue West, Malahide Road and Killester Avenue. Killester Village and Artane Castle Shopping Centre are also nearby. Donnycarney West won 'Pride of Place' area in 2012.

Donnycarney is divided by Malahide Road (where the church stands) into two separate parts- Donnycarney West (Old Donnycarney built 1930s) street names are all named after trees Oak, Elm, Hazel, and Holly with the exception of Belton Park while the other end known as North Donnycarney (New Donnycarney built in the 1940s) all start with 'Clan', Clancarthy, Clandonagh etc.

Donnycarney is also home to two primary schools (located next to the community centre and the Parish Church) on Collins Avenue, Our Lady of Consolation National School which caters for girls until 6th class and Scoil Chiarain which caters for boys until 6th class. Secondary schools include St. Davids Boys Secondary School in Artane and St. Mary's Holy Faith Killester for girls, both located just outside of Donnycarney.

In 2016, Donnycarney West erected a community clock, funded by the residents in partnership with Dublin City Council. It is located at the junction of Malahide Road and Collins Avenue.

Donnycarney youth project is a core part of the community in Donnycarney and strives to help young people of the area express themselves with their interests and also introduces young people to new hobbies.

Housing of "Old Donnycarney" 
Present-day Donnycarney is predominantly residential, as a result of developments during 1920s when the Dublin Corporation made housing schemes for suburban areas of the Northside, Dublin. Prior to this, areas such as Donnycarney were quiet farmland with just one village street. 400 cottages were planned by Dublin corporation in Donnycarney for tenant purchase, favouring private middle-class housing. Government housing policies were not in favour of the working class at this time. No slum clearance schemes were tackled until the 1930s, which in turn led to corporation housing being built then. It wasn’t until the 1930s that Dublin Corporation developed these houses.

What is referred to as "Old Donnycarney" are these few hundred houses built in 1931 and 1932 in the townland. These are situated to the left side of the Malahide Road perpendicular to Collins Avenue. An identifier for the houses built at this time is they are located on roads and streets that are named after different types of trees. "Old Donnycarney" streets are called Hazel, Holly, Oak and Elm. There is an exception made for "Belton Park" in Donnycarney, where the houses were privately built in the 1930s by the Belton family. These houses are slightly larger than those built by the corporation, which gave them a higher value. The late politician Charles Haughey was raised in a house on Belton Park.

The Dublin Street Directory of 1873 lists the following houses in Donnycarney at the time: Donnycarney Cottage, Laurel Hill, Elm Mount, Kavanagh’s Grocery, "The Refuge" (Public House), Ganeville, Mount Temple and St. John’s, along with just 8 houses on Oak Road.

Housing of "New Donnycarney" 
"New Donnycarney" consists of around 800 houses, built between 1947 and 1949, just to the right of the same junction. "New" Donnycarney streets are known locally as "the clans" because all street names are preceded by "Clan". 

The later Donnycarney housing scheme was completed in 1949 where it was built on the lands of 'Victoria Park' which was mostly grazing land. 

most "new" Donnycarney housing is located opposite Parnell Park as opposed to the "old" housing that stretches up the length of Collins Avenue towards Whitehall. "New" Donnycarney is located next to an excellent selection of primary schools, secondary schools, shops and cafés.

Governance
Donnycarney is part of the Dáil Éireann constituency of Dublin Bay North, whose five elected representatives are Richard Bruton of Fine Gael, elected in February 1982; Tommy Broughan of Independents 4 Change, elected in November 1992; Independent Finian McGrath, elected in 2002 and Denise Mitchell of Sinn Féin, elected in 2016. A high-profile former TD for the area for 35 years was the former Taoiseach, the late Charles Haughey, whose son Seán also held a seat from 1992 to 2011, and again since 2016.

Religion
Donnycarney is a parish in the Fingal South East deanery of the Roman Catholic Archdiocese of Dublin, served by Our Lady of Consolation Church - one of the largest churches in Dublin which was built in 1969 replacing the old tin church to cater for the growing population of Donnycarney and surrounding areas.

Sport
Donnycarney is the location of Parnell Park, the Dublin GAA home stadium where the Dublin inter-county teams play many of their matches, including lower-profile matches which do not warrant the use of Croke Park, the national stadium.

Donnycarney is also home to the GAA clubs Craobh Chiaráin and St Vincents, who have their base where the area borders Marino.

There are also local soccer teams in the area and Clontarf Golf Club's grounds, which are crossed by the Wad River, are located in Donnycarney.

Notable people
 The English-born judge Henry Draycott bought the manor of Donnycarney in the reign of Elizabeth I.
 Atkins Hamerton, British consul in Zanzibar from 1841 to 1857, was born in Donnycarney in 1804.
 Tommy Eglington, a former Irish footballer who played for  Shamrock Rovers, Everton and Tranmere Rovers was originally from Donnycarney. As an international, Eglington also played for both Ireland teams - the FAI XI and the IFA XI.
 Oscar winner Glen Hansard's family lives in Donnycarney.
 Donnycarney was the boyhood home of Charles Haughey, who grew up on Belton Park Road in Donnycarney West. He subsequently moved to Raheny, then Grange Park in what was then Baldoyle, and later Kinsealy. Donnycarney was also the location of his funeral service in 2006.
 Dublin hurler and all-star winner Alan McCrabbe resides in Casino Park, a part of Donnycarney.
 The Dubliners member Barney McKenna was born in Donnycarney.
 The Chieftains frontman and founder Paddy Moloney was born and raised in Donnycarney.
 The members of the musical group U2 met and formed the band whilst attending Mount Temple Comprehensive School, which is located in a pocket of Clontarf which projects into Donnycarney.
 Leo Rowsome (King of Pipers) A founding member of Comhaltas Ceoltóirí Éireann and also one of the founders of Na Píobairí Uileann lived and worked in Donnycarney for much of his career up until his death in 1970.

References

Towns and villages in Dublin (city)